Immacolata "Imma" Battaglia (born Portici, province of Naples, 28 March 1960) is an Italian left-wing politician and LGBT activist.

Biography

From the late 1980s to 2000 Imma Battaglia was a member of the Centre of Gay Culture "Mario Mieli" as well as its president for more than 5 years. As such she organised the first Gay Pride in Italy (Rome, 1994), and promoted Rome as a possible host for the 2000 World Gay Pride; her efforts were successful and the city was assigned the organisation of such event. The event created controversy in Italian politics because of the contemporaneity with the Great Jubilee of the Roman Catholic Church.

Personal life
An open lesbian. Battaglia is currently engaged to Eva Grimaldi. She was previously engaged to Italian actress Licia Nunez.

See also
Nichi Vendola
Left Ecology Freedom

References

Left Ecology Freedom politicians
21st-century Italian politicians
Italian LGBT rights activists
Italian LGBT politicians
1960 births
Living people
People from Portici
21st-century Italian women politicians
Lesbian politicians